Events from the 1510s in England.

Incumbents
 Monarch – Henry VIII
 Regent – Catherine, Queen Consort (starting 30 June, until 22 October 1513)
 Parliament – 1st of King Henry VIII (starting 21 January, until 23 February 1510), 2nd of King Henry VIII (starting 4 February 1512, until 4 March 1514), 3rd of King Henry VIII (starting 5 February, until 22 December 1515)

Events
 1510
 c. January – Erasmus begins his period of residence in Cambridge.
 21 January – Parliament grants Henry VIII generous tax subsidies.
 31 January – Catherine of Aragon gives birth to her first child, a stillborn daughter.
 17 August – Richard Empson and Edmund Dudley executed for "constructive treason".
 1511
 9 April – St John's College, Cambridge, receives its charter.
 July – Henry VIII's flagship the Mary Rose launched at Portsmouth.
 13 November – War of the League of Cambrai: Henry joins the Holy League against France.
 17 November – the Treaty of Westminster signed between England and Spain forming an alliance against France.
Archery Act attempts to ensure competence in use of the English longbow by most adult males.
 Edward Stafford, 3rd Duke of Buckingham, begins reconstruction of Thornbury Castle in South Gloucestershire as a residence.
 Major fire at Sherston, Wiltshire.
 1512
 February – following Strode's case – that of Member of Parliament Richard Strode imprisoned by a stannary court due to his attempts to introduce a bill alleviating the harsh conditions of tin miners – Parliament passes an act granting MPs immunity from such prosecutions.
 March – Parliament authorises a new poll tax to pay for the War of the League of Cambrai.
 10 August – War of the League of Cambrai: the English fleet, commanded by Admiral Sir Edward Howard, secures victory at the Battle of Saint-Mathieu over the French-Breton fleet, though with loss of its flagship, the Regent, through explosion.
 Woolwich Dockyard established for the Royal Navy.
 Boys aged from 7 upwards are required to be instructed in archery.
 Wolverhampton Grammar School is founded by Sir Stephen Jenyns.
 1513
 5 April – Treaty of Mechlin signed by Henry, Maximilian I, Holy Roman Emperor, Ferdinand II of Aragon and Pope Leo X against France.
 30 April – execution of Edmund de la Pole, 3rd Duke of Suffolk.
 July – War of the League of Cambrai: Scotland declares war on England, in breach of the Treaty of Perpetual Peace.
 16 August – War of the League of Cambrai: Henry VIII leads his troops to victory over the French at the Battle of Guinegate.
 9 September – War of the League of Cambrai: at the Battle of Flodden, King James IV of Scotland is defeated and killed by an English army under Thomas Howard, Earl of Surrey.
 24 September – War of the League of Cambrai: the city of Tournai surrenders to England.
 Deptford Dockyard established for the Royal Navy.
 1514
 April – Henry VIII declares a truce with France in the War of the League of Cambrai.
 20 May – Trinity House is established as a guild of mariners at Deptford to regulate pilotage.
 June – Battle of Hornshole in the Scottish Borders: young men from Hawick defeat a raiding party from England.
 13 June – Henry Grace à Dieu, at over 1,000 tons the largest warship in the world at this time, built at the new Woolwich Dockyard, is dedicated at Erith.
 7 August – Henry VIII concludes an independent peace treaty with France in the War of the League of Cambrai, negotiated by Thomas Wolsey.
 15 September – Thomas Wolsey is appointed Archbishop of York and begins to build York House in London.
 9 October – marriage of Louis XII of France and Mary Tudor (sister of Henry VIII) as part of the peace with France.
 1515
 2 July – Manchester Grammar School endowed by Hugh Oldham, the first free grammar school in England.
 10 September – Thomas Wolsey invested as a Cardinal.
 24 December – Wolsey is named the Lord Chancellor.
 Wolsey commissions the rebuilding of Hampton Court Palace.
 Structural completion of King's College Chapel, Cambridge.
 1516
 Gillingham School founded in Dorset.
 c. December – Thomas More's Utopia is first published (in Latin at Leuven).
 1517
 1 March – Corpus Christi College, Oxford, established by Richard Foxe.
 1 May – Evil May Day riots in London against foreigners.
 A third epidemic of sweating sickness hits Oxford and Cambridge.
 1518
 August – construction of the Manchester Grammar School is completed.
 23 September – Royal College of Physicians founded in London.
 3 October – Cardinal Wolsey's Treaty of London is signed by France, England, the Holy Roman Empire, the Papacy, Spain, Burgundy and the Netherlands allying the European powers against the Ottoman Empire.
 1519
 May – Henry VIII stands as a candidate in the election of the Holy Roman Emperor.
 15 May – official opening of Saint George's Chapel at Windsor Castle.
 Henry VII's Chapel at Westminster Abbey completed.

Births
 1510
 6 October
John Caius, physician (died 1573)
 Rowland Taylor, Protestant martyr (died 1555)
 28 December – Nicholas Bacon, Lord Keeper (died 1579)
 1511
 1 January – Henry, Duke of Cornwall, eldest son of Henry VIII of England (died 22 February)
 1512
 August ? – Catherine Parr, queen consort (died 1548)
 Edward Clinton, 1st Earl of Lincoln, admiral (died 1585)
 1513
 23 December – Thomas Smith, scholar and diplomat (died 1577)
 Elizabeth Seymour, sister-in-law of Henry VIII (died 1563)
 Thomas Watson, Catholic bishop (died 1584)
 1514
 16 June – John Cheke, classical scholar and statesman (died 1557)
 December – Henry, Duke of Cornwall, third son of Henry VIII (stillborn)
 1515
 15 June – Anne Herbert, Countess of Pembroke, born Anne Parr (died 1552)
 22 September – Anne of Cleves, German-born fourth queen of Henry VIII (died 1557)
 8 October – Margaret Douglas, member of the royal family, diplomat (died 1578)
 approx. date
Roger Ascham, scholar and didactic writer (died 1568)
 William Baldwin, writer, editor and theatrical director (died c.1563)
 Leonard Digges, mathematician and surveyor (died c.1559)
 Thomas Seckford, lawyer and royal court official (died 1587)
 1516
 18 February – Queen Mary I of England (died 1558)
 approx. date – Laurence Nowell, antiquarian (died 1571)
 1517
 17 January – Henry Grey, 1st Duke of Suffolk, politician and courtier (executed 1554)
 16 July – Frances Grey, Duchess of Suffolk, granddaughter of Henry VII (died 1559)
 approx. date – Henry Howard, Earl of Surrey, aristocrat and poet (executed 1547)
 1518
approx. date – Edmund Plowden, legal scholar (died 1585)
 1519
approx. date
Thomas Gresham, merchant and financier (died 1579)
 Nicholas Grimald, poet (died 1562)
 Edwin Sandys, bishop (died 1588)

Deaths
 1510
 17 August
 Edmund Dudley, statesman, executed (born c. 1462 or 1471/2)
 Richard Empson, statesman, executed (year of birth unknown)
 1511
 11 February – Henry, Duke of Cornwall, eldest son of Henry VIII of England (born 1 January)
 1513
 10 March – John de Vere, 13th Earl of Oxford, general (born 1443)
 30 April – Edmund de la Pole, 3rd Duke of Suffolk, executed (born c. 1471)
 27 October – George Manners, 11th Baron Ros, nobleman (year of birth unknown)
 Robert Fabyan, chronicler (year of birth unknown)
 1514
 2 January – William Smyth, bishop and statesman (born 1460)
 December – Henry, Duke of Cornwall, third son of Henry VIII of England (stillborn)
 1516
 25 April – John Yonge, diplomat (born 1467)
 1518
 20 November – Marmaduke Constable, soldier (born c. 1455)
 1519
 10 September – John Colet, churchman and educator (born 1467)
 William Grocyn, scholar (born 1446)

References